Nasser Larguet (born 6 November 1958) is a Moroccan football coach, former head of the academy for Marseille. He was briefly the interim coach of the Marseille senior team.

Managerial career
Larguet was born in Morocco, and played football recreationally as a teenager. He moved to France to continue his studies in microbiology at the University of Caen Normandy, but was a part-time amateur footballer with ASPTT Caen, Normande, and Thury-Harcourt. At Thury-Harcourt, Larguet was appointed player coach, where he began his managerial career.

Larguet eventually became the director of football for various clubs in France, including Rouen, Cannes, Caen, and Strasbourg, and also had a stint as manager of the reserves of Le Havre from 2003 to 2004. From 2008 to 2014, he was appointed director of the Mohammed VI Football Academy. He was a technical director for the Morocco national team from 2014 to 2019.

In 28 June 2019, he was hired as the head of the academy of Marseille. In February 2021, he was appointed interim manager of Marseille after André Villas-Boas handed in his resignation. Larguet was succeeded in his role by Jorge Sampaoli.

On 25 April 2022, Marseille and Larguet parted ways after the club announced the departure of its current director of academy "for personal reasons", taking effect the following week on 2 May 2022.

Managerial statistics

References

External links
 
 FDB Profile

1958 births
Living people
People from Rabat-Salé-Kénitra
Moroccan footballers
Moroccan football managers
Moroccan emigrants to France
Olympique de Marseille managers
Olympique de Marseille non-playing staff
Ligue 1 managers
Championnat National 2 players
Championnat National 3 players
Association footballers not categorized by position